Maharaja Birendra Kishore Manikya Museum, is a proposed digital museum and being developed as a national-level cultural centre, at the Pushbanta Palace in Agartala, capital of Tripura.

The Proposal 
The foundation stone for the digital museum at Pushbanta Palace was laid by Draupadi Murmu, the President of India, on October 14, 2022. It is estimated that about forty crore rupees have been sanctioned for the development of the heritage structure as a digital museum. There would be a display of the heritage of the North Eastern States, fine arts of South East Asia, and contemporary photography, as well as the national and international archives.

References 

Museums in Tripura